The 2012 Scottish local elections were held on 3 May 2012 in all 32 local authorities. The Scottish National Party (SNP) overtook Labour to win the highest share of the vote, and retained and strengthened its position as the party with most councillors. Labour also made gains, while the Liberal Democrats experienced meltdown, losing over half their seats and falling behind the Conservatives.  For the first time since the introduction of the Single Transferable Vote system, the SNP won majority control of 2 councils, from no overall control. Labour also won majority control of 2 councils from no overall control, while retaining majority control over 2 councils.

Independent councillors retained majority control over the 3 island councils.  The 23 other councils remained under no overall control.

Background
The election was due to be held on 5 May 2011, but Scottish Ministers heeded the advice of the Gould Report and split the Holyrood and local elections - in order to avoid a repeat of the 2007 fiasco. These local elections were the second since the Single Transferable Vote (STV) was first introduced for the 2007 local government elections. This election was the first since the SNP won a majority in the Scottish Parliament. They were also the first local elections in Scotland since 1995 not to take place at the same time as a Scottish parliamentary election.

New eCounting system
In October 2010 a new company - Logica was awarded the contract for the vote counting system for the 2012 council elections, and since January 2011 testing has been under way to sort out many issues. On the 5 August 2011, A Dummy election was set up in Perth to test out new "eCounting" system, as part of robust test, in which 160,000 ballot papers run through the machine.  This forms third stage of rigorous testing of the system in partition of these elections.

Party performance
Both the SNP and Labour performed well, increasing both share of the vote and their numbers of councillors. The SNP gained control of two councils from No Overall Control: Angus and Dundee. Labour gained majority control over two councils, Renfrewshire and West Dunbartonshire, also from No Overall Control, and held on to their overall majority in both Glasgow and North Lanarkshire councils. The Conservatives lost significant ground, but did gain a seat in Argyll & Bute and managed to come third.

The Liberal Democrats continued to experience a political meltdown following on from the previous year's Scottish elections, losing 57% of their councillors. In the Edinburgh ward of Pentland Hills, Mike 'Professor Pongoo' Ferrigan, who dressed as a penguin to council meetings, received 444 first-preference votes, 74 more than the Liberal Democrat candidate, Stuart Bridges, and 122 more than the Green Party candidate. In Edinburgh, where the Liberal Democrats had previously been in a ruling coalition with the SNP, they lost 13 of their 16 seats. In the Fife Council ward of Buckhaven, Methil and Wemyss Villages, the party's candidate, Lois Lothian, received just 21 votes.

The Greens boosted their councillor numbers from 8 to 14, including doubling their representation in Edinburgh (where they topped the poll in two wards for the first time) and electing councillors for the first time to Stirling, Midlothian and Aberdeenshire local authorities (note: Cllr Martin Ford, re-elected in 2012 as a Green, won in 2007 as a Liberal Democrat).

The Scottish Socialist Party held its sole seat, that of Jim Bollan in West Dunbartonshire. Meanwhile, the UK Independence Party lost its sole councillor in Scotland on Fife Council. Independent councillors retained majority control over the three island councils (Na h-Eileanan Siar, Orkney and Shetland).

Aftermath

Talks took place to decide who would control of the 23 remaining councils   This resulted in Labour taking control of Fife, East and West Lothian, Inverclyde and South Lanarkshire and forming a grand coalition with the SNP in the City of Edinburgh and an anti-Conservative alliance in East Renfrewshire.

The SNP took control of Clackmannanshire, North Ayrshire and Perth and Kinross and became the largest party in controlling coalitions in Argyll and Bute, Highland, Midlothian, Scottish Borders and East Ayrshire. They also joined the Scottish Conservatives in a coalition arrangement in Dumfries and Galloway.

Results
Results to follow: 
|-style="background-color:#E9E9E9;text-align:center;"
!colspan="2" rowspan="2" width="175"|Party
!colspan="3"| First-preference votes
!colspan="3"| Seats won
|-style="background-color:#E9E9E9"
!width="75"|#
!%
!Swing (pp)
!width="35"|#
!Net Gain
!%
|- style="text-align:right;"
| style="background-color:"|
| style="text-align:left;" |SNP
|503,233
|32.33
| style="background-color:#dfd" | +4.48
|425
| style="background-color:#dfd" | +62
|34.75
|- style="text-align:right;"
| style="background-color:"|
| style="text-align:left;" |Labour
|488,703
|31.39
| style="background-color:#dfd" | +3.26
|394
| style="background-color:#dfd" | +46
|32.22
|- style="text-align:right;"
| style="background-color:"|
| style="text-align:left;" |Conservative
|206,599
|13.27
| style="background-color:#ffe8e8;" | −2.35
|115
| style="background-color:#ffe8e8;" | −28
|9.40
|- style="text-align:right;"
| style="background-color:"|
| style="text-align:left;" |Independents
|183,329
|11.78
| style="background-color:#dfd" | +1.27
|196
| style="background-color:#dfd" | +12
|16.03
|- style="text-align:right;"
| style="background-color:"|
| style="text-align:left;" |Liberal Democrats
|103,087
|6.62
| style="background-color:#ffe8e8;" | −6.05
|71
| style="background-color:#ffe8e8;" | −95
|5.81
|- style="text-align:right;"
| style="background-color:"|
| style="text-align:left;" |Green
|36,000
|2.31
| style="background-color:#dfd" | +0.11
|14
| style="background-color:#dfd" | +6
|1.14
|- style="text-align:right;"
| style="background-color:"|
| style="text-align:left;" |UKIP
|4,289
|0.28
| style="background-color:#dfd" | +0.22
|0
| ±0
|0.00
|- style="text-align:right;"
| style="background-color:"|
| style="text-align:left;" |Scottish Socialist
|4,183
|0.27
| style="background-color:#ffe8e8;" | −0.61
|1
| ±0
|0.08
|- style="text-align:right;"
| style="background-color:"|
| style="text-align:left;" |Borders Party
|3,755
|0.24
| style="background-color:#dfd" |  +0.12
|2
| ±0
|0.16
|- style="text-align:right;"
|
| style="text-align:left;" |Action to Save St John's Hospital	
|3,474
|0.22
| style="background-color:#dfd" | +0.03
|0
| style="background-color:#ffe8e8;" | −3
|0.00
|- style="text-align:right;"
|
| style="text-align:left;" |East Dunbartonshire Independent Alliance
|2,973
|0.19
| style="background-color:#ffe8e8;" | −0.09
|2
| ±0
|0.16
|- style="text-align:right;"
| style="background-color:"|
| style="text-align:left;" |Glasgow First
|2,547
|0.16
| style="background-color:#dfd" | +0.16
|1
| style="background-color:#dfd" | +1
|0.08
|- style="text-align:right;"
| style="background-color:"|
| style="text-align:left;" |TUSC
|2,485
|0.16
| style="background-color:#dfd" | +0.16
|0
| ±0
|0.00
|- style="text-align:right;"
| style="background-color:"|
| style="text-align:left;" |Christian Party
|2,344
|0.15
| style="background-color:#dfd" | +0.12
|0
| ±0
|0.00
|- style="text-align:right;"
| style="background-color:"|
| style="text-align:left;" |All Scotland Pensioners Party
|2,328
|0.15
| style="background-color:#dfd" | +0.08
|0
| ±0
|0.00
|- style="text-align:right;"
|
| style="text-align:left;" |Cumbernauld Independent Alliance
|1,894
|0.12
| style="background-color:#dfd" | +0.02
|1
| ±0
|0.08
|- style="text-align:right;"
| style="background-color:"|
| style="text-align:left;" |Unionist
|864
|0.06
| style="background-color:#ffe8e8;" | −0.09
|0
| ±0
|0.00
|- style="text-align:right;"
|
| style="text-align:left;" |Perth Independent Candidates
|805
|0.05
| style="background-color:#dfd" | +0.05
|1
| style="background-color:#dfd" | +1
|0.08
|- style="text-align:right;"
| style="background-color:"|
| style="text-align:left;" |Solidarity
|787
|0.05
| style="background-color:#ffe8e8;" | −0.81
|0
| style="background-color:#ffe8e8;" | −1
|0.00
|- style="text-align:right;"
| style="background-color:"|
| style="text-align:left;" |Socialist Labour Party
|714
|0.05
| style="background-color:#dfd" | +0.03
|0
| ±0
|0.00
|- style="text-align:right;"
|
| style="text-align:left;" |East Kilbride Alliance
|681
|0.04
| style="background-color:#ffe8e8;" | −0.03
|0
| ±0
|0.00
|- style="text-align:right;"
| style="background-color:"|
| style="text-align:left;" |Liberal
|595
|0.04
| style="background-color:#ffe8e8;" | −0.02
|0
| ±0
|0.00
|- style="text-align:right;"
| style="background-color:"|
| style="text-align:left;" |National Front
|369
|0.02
| style="background-color:#dfd" | +0.02
|0
| ±0
|0.00
|- style="text-align:right;"
| style="background-color:"|
| style="text-align:left;" |Pirate Party
|292
|0.02
| style="background-color:#dfd" | +0.02
|0
| ±0
|0.00
|- style="text-align:right;"
| style="background-color:"|
| style="text-align:left;" |Christian Peoples Alliance
|209
|0.01
| style="background-color:#dfd" | +0.01
|0
| ±0
|0.00
|- style="text-align:right;"
| style="background-color:"|
| style="text-align:left;" |Communist Party of Britain
|94
|<0.01
| style="background-color:#dfd" | +0.01
|0
| ±0
|0.00
|- style="text-align:right;"
|
| style="text-align:left;" |Britannica
|73
|<0.01
|
|0
| ±0
|0.00
|- style="text-align:right;"
| style="background-color:"|
| style="text-align:left;" |Official Monster Raving Loony Party
|67
|<0.01
|
|0
| ±0
|0.00
|-style="background-color:#E9E9E9;text-align:right;"
! colspan="2" style="text-align:left;" |Total
!1,556,773
!100.00
! ±0.00
!1,223
! +1
! 100.00
|}

Note: The net gain/loss and percentage change in number of votes relates to the result of the previous Scottish local elections on 3 May 2007. This differs from the table in the reference above  which shows gain/loss relative to seats held at dissolution of Scotland's councils.

Analysis

Councils

Name of party shows the largest group within each council.  However, the party names in brackets identify members of a coalition leading the council.  In some cases, the largest party is shown, but is not in charge of the council.

Further reading
 

Complete results and vote data files for all wards in Scotland, with figures illustrating the count process, are available at Scottish Council election May 2012

Notes

References

 
2012
Local
May 2012 events in the United Kingdom